Omar Samra (born 11 August 1978) is a British-born Egyptian adventurer, entrepreneur and speaker. He is the first Egyptian to climb Mount Everest, the 7 Summits and ski to both the Geographic South and North Pole (the Explorers Grand Slam). He is also the first Egyptian to complete the 7 Summits challenge on 31 May 2013, climbing the highest mountain on all seven continents. Samra was the 31st is person in history to complete the "Explorers Grand Slam" challenge, which include climbing the highest mountain on every continent, the 7 summits, and skiing to both the South and North Poles. Samra has also been selected for the IIAS's  PoSSUM (Polar Suborbital Science in the Upper Mesosphere) program along with 2 other Egyptians, Abdelraouf El Waqad and Ahmed Farid

Biography 

Born in Wimbledon, London, Samra moved to Cairo when he was only weeks old. He finished his schooling at El Alsson School and graduated from the American University in Cairo (AUC) in 2000 with a BA in Economics and minor in Business Administration. He was also awarded an MBA degree at the London Business School in 2007 with a concentration in Entrepreneurship. Between his bachelors and masters level education, Samra worked with HSBC in London and Hong Kong for two and a half years before embarking on a 370-day journey across Asia and Latin America (14 countries).

Upon his return from his yearlong trip, Samra resumed working in London in the banking field and began his 2-year MBA programme 1.5 years after that. His expedition to Mount Everest began upon the completion of his MBA in March 2007 and lasted for 9.5 weeks. Samra then moved back to Cairo to work for Actis in the field of Emerging Markets Private Equity.

In May 2009, Samra decided to leave his corporate career behind and founded Wild Guanabana, the Middle East & North Africa's first carbon-neutral travel company specializing in ethical and adventure travel which has offices in Cairo and Dubai.
His wife Marwa Fayed died in 2013 days after the birth of their first and only daughter Teela.

In the early 2010s, Samra participated in the Axe Apollo space campaign. He was among the winners or the marketing campaign and was supposed to be sent to sub-orbital space on board the Lynx. However the spaceflight was cancelled. He could have been the first Egyptian in space have the flight pushed through.

Climbing 
Samra climbed his first snowy mountain in the Swiss Alps at the age of 16. The trip inspired him and it is then that he decided that he would like to climb Everest one day. An unrealistic goal at the time, especially given that Samra was severely asthmatic at age 11. After his Swiss experience, he went on to trek and climb extensively in the UK, Himalayas, Alps, Andean, Patagonian and Central American mountain ranges. Other adventures include traversing the Costa Rican jungle in 3 weeks, cycling across the Atlas Mountains of Morocco, around Andalusia in Spain and from London to Paris. As a keen traveler, Samra has been to over 80 countries and published writing about his traveling experiences in both English and Arabic. He is currently working on publishing his first book on the same topic.

Accomplishments 

 Completing the 7 Summits – In climbing the highest mountain on every continent, Samra become the first Egyptian to do so. He also achieved a world first by completing the first carbon neutral challenge of its kind through offsetting all the carbon emissions from his expedition and travels.
 Completing the Explorers Grand Slam – In skiing to both geographic poles, and climbing the highest mountain on every continent before that, Samra succeeded in becoming the first Egyptian to complete what is known as the Explorers Grand Slam.

References

External links
 

1978 births
Alumni of London Business School
Living people
Egyptian mountain climbers
Summiters of the Seven Summits
The American University in Cairo alumni
Astronaut candidates